Ferness is a settlement and rural area in Strathdearn, in the council area of Highland.

The settlement is situated in a forested area of the valley of the River Findhorn at the crossroads of the A939 Nairn–Grantown-on-Spey and B9007 Forres–Carrbridge roads.

Notable People
John Baird Simpson was born and raised here.
Ellie Stone

In popular culture
Ferness was at the centre of the story in the 1983 comedy-drama Local Hero.

References

Populated places in the County of Nairn